Narharpur is a village of Vaishali district in the Bihar state of India. It belongs to Tirhut Division. It is about 35 km from headquarters Hajipur. It is located in the Jandaha block of the District. It comes under the Mahanar constitution in State Assembly & Hajipur Parliamentary in Lok Sabha. Brahm Sthan Kalisthan is a holy place and located in middle in this village

Geography 
Narharpur is located at 25.68°N 85.22°E.

Transport 
It is well connected to Mahua(8 km) and Desari(7 km) via Roadways. Many express trains stop at the nearest rail station in Desari.

Education 
The education level is relatively high as per the Indian village standard.
 Middle School Narharpur: Facilities provide education up to 8th standard. It is furnished with a playground. The school has had a good track record in quality education for many years.
High School Narharpur Mukundpur: Facilities provide education up to 10th standard. At one time students from 32 villages came to this school for their schooling. Today, alumni from this school are working in different parts of the country with leading multi-national corporations.

Religion 
Hinduism is the dominant religion in this area.

See also
 List of villages in Vaishali district

Villages in Vaishali district